The  Ahat Jami Mosque,  is a congregational mosque located in Donetsk, Ukraine. The mosque was named in honor of local mafia boss Akhat Bragin and one of its minarets is named after Rinat Akhmetov. It is the first mosque to be  built in Donets basin since the fall of the Soviet Union. Although de jure located in Ukraine, the mosque is on territory currently controlled by the unrecognized Donetsk People's Republic.

History
In 1993 in the Donetsk Muslim community established Star of the Prophet. One year later, the foundation was laid for the region's first mosque, Ibn Fadlan. The plans for the project were taken from one of Istanbul's mosques.

The main sponsor for the building was Akhat Bragin. After his death  on  October 15, 1995, the  mosque was named in his honor. Initially the project called for the construction of one minaret but financing from Rinat Akhmetov made it possible to build two. The second was named in honor of him. On the first floor of the mosque is located Ukrainian Islamic University -the first Muslim institution of higher education in Ukraine.

The official opening of the Ahat Cami mosque and Ukrainian Islamic University was held on September 3, 1999.

See also
Islam in Ukraine

References 

1999 establishments in Ukraine
Mosques in Ukraine
Mosques completed in 1999
Buildings and structures in Donetsk
Culture in Donetsk
Volga Tatars